Jonathan "Jonny" Godsmark (born 3 September 1989) is an English footballer who plays for Ashington.

Career
Godsmark started his career with Newcastle United and made his reserve team debut in Northumberland Senior Cup against Walker on 16 October 2006, and then scored his first reserve goal after coming on as a substitute in the Premier Reserve League fixture at Wigan Athletic on 24 January 2007. He struck two goals for the second string in 2006/07. Slight of build, Godsmark made an impact with his skillful ball-playing as a wing man and he was nicknamed "Guide Post-born Speed Demon" by the Geordie media. He made his first senior appearance as a substitute for Newcastle in the 0–1 away friendly defeat at Hull City on 1 August 2007 and signed a professional contract in 2008.

On 6 August 2009 it was confirmed that he would be going on loan to Hereford United on a six-month loan deal.
He made his Football League debut for Hereford United against Morecambe in August 2009. He scored his first goal for Hereford in extra time of a League Cup tie against Charlton Athletic, a goal which proved to be the winner. He then went on to score the equaliser in the next match, against Cheltenham Town which ended 1-1. Godsmark was released by Newcastle at the end of the 2009–10 season and has signed for his local club Ashington.

References

External links

1989 births
Living people
English footballers
Association football midfielders
Newcastle United F.C. players
Hereford United F.C. players
Ashington A.F.C. players
English Football League players